Timothy Patrick "Tim Pat" Coogan (born 22 April 1935) is an Irish writer, broadcaster and newspaper columnist. He served as editor of The Irish Press newspaper from 1968-87. He has been best-known for such books as The IRA, Ireland Since the Rising, On the Blanket, and biographies of Michael Collins and Éamon de Valera. His biography of de Valera proved controversial, taking issue with the former Irish president's reputation and achievements, in favour of those of Collins, whom he regards as indispensable to the creation of the new State. 

His particular focus has been Ireland's nationalist/independence movement in the 20th century, a period of unprecedented political upheaval. He has blamed the Troubles in Northern Ireland on "Paisleyism".

Biography

Coogan was born in Monkstown, County Dublin in 1935, the first of three children born to Beatrice (née Toal) and Ned Coogan. Ned (sometimes referred to as "Eamonn Ó Cuagain"), a native of Kilkenny, was an Irish Republican Army volunteer during the War of Independence and later served as the first Deputy Commissioner of the newly established Garda Síochána, then a Fine Gael TD for the Kilkenny constituency. Beatrice Toal, the daughter of a policeman, was a Dublin socialite who was crowned Dublin's Civic Queen of Beauty in 1927. She wrote for the Evening Herald and took part in various productions in the Abbey Theatre and Radio Éireann. Coogan spent many summer holidays in the town of Castlecomer in County Kilkenny, his father's home town.

A former student of the Irish Christian Brothers in Dún Laoghaire and Belvedere College in Dublin, he spent most of his secondary studies in Blackrock College in Dublin.

In 2000, Irish writer and editor Ruth Dudley Edwards was awarded £25,000 damages and a public apology by the High Court in London against Coogan for factual errors in references to her in his book Wherever Green is Worn: the Story of the Irish Diaspora.

When Taoiseach Enda Kenny caused confusion following a speech at Béal na Bláth by incorrectly claiming Michael Collins had brought Lenin to Ireland, Coogan commented: "Those were the days when bishops were bishops and Lenin was a communist. How would that [Collins bringing Lenin to Ireland] have gone down with the churchyard collections?"

In November 2012, for reasons that are uncertain, the United States embassy in Dublin refused to grant Coogan a visa to visit the U.S.  As a result a planned book tour for his latest book (The Famine Plot, England's role in Ireland's Greatest Tragedy) was cancelled. After representations to then Secretary of State Hillary Clinton by United States Senator Charles Schumer (D-NY) and Congressman Peter T. King (R-NY), Coogan received his visa.

Criticism

Coogan has been criticised by Irish historians Liam Kennedy, Diarmaid Ferriter and Cormac Ó Gráda, among others, for a supposed lack of thoroughness in his research and bias: 
 "Well, I waited in this book to hear some great revelation and it just isn’t there. It’s anticlimactic. I could not see the great plot, and indeed there is no serious historian who ... I can’t think of a single historian who has researched the Famine in depth – and Tim Pat has not researched it in depth" (The Famine Plot).
 "Coogan is not remotely interested in looking at what others have written on 20th-century Irish history. ... he does not appear interested in context and shows scant regard for evidence. He does not attempt to offer any sustained analysis in relation to the challenges of state building, the meaning of sovereignty, economic and cultural transformations, or comparative perspectives on the evolution of Irish society. There is no indication whatsoever that Coogan has engaged with the abundant archival material relating to the subject matter he pronounces on. There is no rhyme or reason when it comes to the citation of the many quotations he uses; the vast majority are not referenced. For the 300-page text, 21 endnotes are cited and six of them relate to Coogan's previous books, a reminder that much of this tome consists of recycled material. ... Tim Pat Coogan ... he is a decent, compassionate man who has made a significant contribution to Irish life. But he has not read up on Irish history; indeed, such is the paucity of his research efforts that this book amounts to a travesty of 20th-century Irish history" (1916: The Mornings After).

Bibliography
Ireland since the Rising, 1966; ASIN B0000CMYHI 
The IRA, 1970; 
The Irish: A Personal View, 1975; .
On the Blanket: The H Block story, 1980; Ward River Press - Dublin ASIN: B0013LSNEU. . A paperback original, no hardcover was issued. First editions are uncommon in good condition. A controversial account of the "dirty protest" in the Ireland of the time. 
Ireland and the Arts, 1986.
Disillusioned Decades: Ireland 1966–87, 1987; .

De Valera: Long Fellow, Long Shadow, 1993; .
The Troubles: Ireland's Ordeal 1966–1995 and the Search for Peace, 1995; .

Wherever Green is Worn: The Story of the Irish Diaspora, 2000; .
1916: The Easter Rising, 2001; .
Ireland in the Twentieth Century, 2003; 
Memoir, 2008; .
The Famine Plot: England's Role in Ireland's Greatest Tragedy, 2012; .
1916: The Mornings After, 2015; .
The Twelve Apostles, 2016; . An account of the Dublin based assassination squad assembled by Michael Collins during the War of Independence.
 The GAA and the War of Independence,2018;

References

External links
 Tim Pat Coogan official website
 "The Green Book" — chapter from The IRA, Coogan's book on the Irish Republican Army
 More on "The Green Book"
 Historyextra.com
 Irish Times article

1935 births
Living people
Irish columnists
Irish writers
Irish newspaper editors
People educated at Blackrock College
The Irish Press people
Anti-Revisionism (Ireland)
People educated at Belvedere College
People from Monkstown, County Dublin
20th-century Irish historians
21st-century Irish historians